Mohill GAA is a Gaelic Athletic Association gaelic football club in Mohill, County Leitrim, Ireland.

The parish of Mohill currently has two GAA Football Clubs, Mohill who play in Division 1 and the Senior Championship and Eslin who play in Division 2 and the Intermediate Championship. The Mohill Club also fields teams in Divisions 3 and Junior Championship and Division 4 and Junior B Championship. Both Clubs have won Senior Titles in the past and in fact Mohill Faugh-an-Bealaghs won the first Leitrim Senior Championship in 1890, defeating Ballinamore in the final. Eslin won their first title the following year by defeating Mohill in the Final. They won the last of their three Titles in 1917 but have won several Junior Championships in the meantime. Mohill won their most recent Senior titles in 2006, 2015, 2017 and 2020.

2015

2015 marked the 126th anniversary of Mohill GAA Club. That year they won three doubles, a feat that had never before been achieved in the county.

In April their Minors became the first team to win five in a row Minor Leagues. They beat Ballinamore Seán O'Heslin's by 2 points in the League Final on a scoreline of 3–11 to 2–12.

In July, the Juniors won the Division 3 League for the first time since 1978 beating Ballinaglera by a point in a tight affair in Ballinamore. 1–8 to 0–10 was the final score with Captain Padraig Tighe getting the equaliser and the winner late on the snatch victory.

Afterward, their Seniors beat Allen Gaels, Drumreilly and Kiltubrid on the way and racked up 13–42 in three games, while the Juniors edged out Dromahair and beating Carrigallen on the way to the quarter-finals. At the quarter-final stage of the Senior and Junior Championships, the Minors were halfway through their Championship, having lost twice to the favourites for the title Fenagh/Gortletteragh, scoring two wins out of four.

Their Seniors beat Annaduff in the quarter-final of the Championship on a scoreline of 2–13 to 0–9 with the Juniors beating Allen Gaels the following day to advance to their Semi-final. Their Seniors would set up a tie with neighbours Gortletteragh and the Juniors would meet Carrigallen, who they had beaten in the group already.

In the Senior Semi-final, they edged out on a scoreline of 0–8 to 0–6 after trailing 0–4 to 0–2 at the interval. Nevertheless, they booked a place in the Senior Championship Final vs the Kingpins of Leitrim Football in recent times Glencar–Manorhamilton. The Juniors beat Carrigallen and went on to face Ballinamore Seán O'Heslin's. Their Minors at this stage had lost three games and won three games in the Championship, which set up at Semi-final meeting with Ballinamore Seán O'Heslins. A win against Sean O'Heslins 1–12 to 1–9 meant they had qualified for their fourth Minor Championship Final in a row, as well as the Senior and Junior Championship Finals.

The Senior and Minor Finals went to Replays, with the Junior A Final going to extra time. They won the Senior Final with a Ronan Kennedy goal as the last kick of the game beating Glencar/Manor 1–4 to 0–6. The first Minor Final was rescued after they trailed 0–10 to 0–4 with 8 minutes remaining. They scored 2–1 including an injury time goal to salvage a draw, and in the replay they finished 4–11 to 3–11. This ensured the Minor double and left open the opportunity to become the first club to win a Minor-Senior double as they were awaiting Glencar/Manor in the Senior League Final. On the first Saturday in November, they left it late once again in the Division 1 League Final, and Ronan Kennedy scored a point with the last kick of the game to secure the club's second League title.

The following weekend, Ballinamore were the opponents in the Junior Championship Final, and once again it went down to the wire. Level at full time, extra was confirmed. Although conditions were poor in Cloone, John McGuinness scored the winning point in the last minute. 0–11 to 0–10 was the full-time score. This win secured a historic "Triple Double" for 2015 as they earned the Senior, Junior and Minor League and Championship titles.

2015 Roll of Honour

Senior Championship

Senior League

Junior Championship

Junior League

Minor Championship

Minor League

U12 Div 2 Championship

History

Senior

Mohill have won the Senior Championship eight times, in 1890, 1914, 1929, 1971, 2006, 2015, 2017 and 2020. 2006 was their first Senior title in 35 years but amazingly was also their first time to contest a final since 1974. In October 2006, they completed a five-point comeback with six minutes remaining to win by a point. In December 2006 they won the Division 1 League for the first time in the club's history, defeating Aughawillan in Ballinamore. Both Mohill and Aughawillan had contested the Division 2 League Final of 2005.

They reached the Senior Championship Semi-final in 2010, narrowly losing to Glencar–Manorhamilton and in 2013 lost the final to St Marys/Kiltoghert. they contested four League Finals in a row from 2013 to 2016, winning their first since 2006 in 2015 beating Glencar/Manor with an injury time point from Ronan Kennedy.

The Championship Final of 2015 was their third appearance in a final in 10 years. Glencar–Manorhamilton were back in their first final in three years. On 27 September the showpiece of Leitrim football ended all square in Pairc Sean MacDiarmada as they relinquished a four-point lead in the last five minutes. Leading 0–12 to 1–5, Glencar/Manor scored four points on the trot to rescue the game with an injury time free forcing a Replay with the full-time score at 0–12 to 1–9.

During the replay, the score stood at 0–6 to 0–4 and with one last throw of the dice, Ronan Gallagher let the ball into the square only to land in the possession of North Leitrim. But a fumble on the way out of the defence seen the ball scooped up by Alan McLoughlin who had a hit and hope shot from the edge of the D land in the hands of Ronan Kennedy, who side-stepped Pat Gilmartin, took a hop, and calmly placed the ball to the Glencar/Manor net. As soon as the ball hit the net, referee Ray McBrien blew the full-time whistle amidst wild celebrations from the Mohill players, managers, supporters and also many neutrals.

In December 2016, they retained the Senior League for the first time ever beating Aughawillan after extra-time.

Junior Titles

In 1978, their first team won the Junior A League and Championship only seven years after claiming the Senior Championship. Their second and third teams have also tasted success winning the Junior B Championship in 1997 and the Junior C Championship in 2003. In recent years their second team were not promoted to Division 2 and Intermediate Championship before 2013 after losing the Junior A Championship in 2011 and finishing just outside the top two in Division 3 on numerous occasions.

In 2013, they contested their first Senior Championship Final since 2006 but lost to St Marys Kiltoghert 2–14 to 2–8. A week later they contested the Junior A Championship Final for the second time in three years. They defeated St Marys on a scoreline of 2–12 to 1–8 winning their first Junior A Championship in 35 years. This win brought to a conclusion a week in which they won the Junior A and Minor A Championship and lost the Senior Championship Final.

In 2015, they topped off the most successful year in the club's history by being promoted to Division 2 and the Intermediate Championship winning the Junior League and Championship, the first Junior double in the county since 1995 and their first since 1978.

St Manchans – U21 & Minor Titles

Mohill and Eslin amalgamate for Minor and U21 under the name St Manchans, named after the patron saint of the parish. St Manchans first amalgamated in 1975 and first tasted success in 1976, winning the Minor League. Manchans went on to win the Minor Championship in 1983 and 1986 before the amalgamation resolved until 2008 when it was revived once again. 

Since 2008, St Manchans have contested eight Minor League Finals in 2008, 2010, 2011, 2012, 2013, 2014, 2015 and 2016 winning six in a row since 2011. They have also contested five Minor Championship Finals in a row from 2012 to 2016, winning in 2013 vs Sean O'Heslins and in 2015 after a replay vs Fenagh/Gortletteragh. St Manchans U21s also won the Championship in 2016, 2017 and 2010 and contesting finals in 2012, 2013 and 2014, but losing all three. Mohill and Gortletteragh have also amalgamated in the past to form Lough Rynn Gaels. In the late 1970s, they won the U21 Championship in 1977 and 1978 and the Minor Championship in 1979.

On three occasions Mohill have won four-in-a-row Minor Leagues in 1983, 1984, 1985 and 1986 and in 1996, 1997, 1998 and 1999 and again in 2011, 2012, 2013 and 2014. They finally made the breakthrough in 2015 by achieving five in a row, then six in a row in 2016. Many of the players who won four Minor Leagues in the 1980s also were victorious at U16 level, winning four-in-a-row Championships in 1981, 1982, 1983 and 1984. Also the same in the 1990s as they won three-in-a-row U16 Leagues in 1995, 1996 and 1997 and again in the 2000s when they won three U16 Championships in a row in 2011, 2012 and 2013.

Since 2000 Mohill have won numerous underage Leagues and Championships including three Minor A Championships in a row in 2003, 2004 and 2005. They also won the League in 2003 and 2004.

U16 Titles

At U16 level they have had success in Division 1 in recent years but until 2011, Mohill hadn't won an U16 A Championship since 1997, though they won at lower grades before that. A Division 3 League in 2007 and Division 2 Leagues in 2003 and 2008. In 2014 their U16s retained the League title making it 3 in a row Leagues 2012, 2013 and 2014 and in 2013 they completed the double making it 3 in a row Championships for 2011, 2012 and 2013.

U14 Titles

At U14 level they have also been successful, winning the U14 Division 1 League and Championship in 2011 and winning the Division 1 League in 2013 but narrowly losing the Championship Final by a point to Fenagh/St Caillins. Before 2010 they competed at a lower grade in U14 winning a Division 4 Championship in 2006 and losing the Division 2 Championship Final in 2007, Division 2 League Finals in 2008 and 2009 and the Division 1 League Final in 2010.

U12 Titles

In 2010 a motion was passed to get rid of competitive football at U12 level, but before that they won many U12 titles. In 2004 they won the Division 3 U12 League and retained it in 2005. In 2006 they lost the Division 3 Championship Final but this team, who were playing Division 3 at U12 level went on to contest the Minor A Championship Final in 2012. 

In 2008 they won the U12 Division 2 League and this turned out to be the last year the U12 League was played. In 2009, their U12s won the A Championship, winning their club's first U12 Championship since 1993. With the U12 Leagues and Championships done away with after this, there was a blitz basis brought in with Finals to be played at the end of all the rounds. In 2011 their U12s won the Division 1 Shield on this basis. In 2014, a Championship basis was once again revived at this level, and in 2015 they won the Division 2 Championship.

Mohill GAA Club released a history book in December 2016 called 'Fág A Bealach – Clear the Way 1889–2015'

Mohill GAA Club is 130 years old in 2019.

Notable players
Keith Beirne

Honours

 * Won as St Manchans (Mohill/Eslin)
 ** Won as Lough Rynn Gaels (Mohill/Gortletteragh)

References

External links
 Mohill GAA Website
 Mohill GAA Facebook Page

Gaelic games clubs in County Leitrim
Gaelic football clubs in County Leitrim
Mohill